Patrick F. Ford Jr. (born James Meredith; April 11, 1872 – January 18, 1915) was a private serving in the United States Marine Corps during the Spanish–American War who received the Medal of Honor for bravery.

Biography
Meredith was born April 11, 1872, in Omaha, Nebraska. He joined the Marine Corps from Boston in July 1896. He officially changed his name to Patrick F. Ford, Jr. in June 1900 and was honorably discharged under that name in September 1901.

He died January 18, 1915, and is buried in Saint Marys Cemetery Omaha, Nebraska.

Medal of Honor citation
Rank and organization: Private, U.S. Marine Corps. (Name changed to Patrick F. Ford, Jr ) Born: 11 April 1872, Omaha, Nebr. Accredited to: Virginia. G.O. No.: 521, 7 July 1899.

Citation:

On board the U.S.S. Marblehead during the operation of cutting the cable leading from Cienfuegos, Cuba, 11 May 1898. Facing the heavy fire of the enemy, Meredith displayed extraordinary bravery and coolness throughout this action.

See also

List of Medal of Honor recipients for the Spanish–American War

References

External links

1872 births
1915 deaths
United States Marine Corps Medal of Honor recipients
United States Marines
American military personnel of the Spanish–American War
Military personnel from Omaha, Nebraska
Spanish–American War recipients of the Medal of Honor